Live Noumatrouff, 1997 is a live album by Industrial band The Young Gods. It was recorded on September 27, 1997. This record was originally released as a gift for the audience of The Young Gods concert at Noumatrouff in Mulhouse, France, on May 6, 2000.

Track listing
 "Gasoline Man" - 4:36
 "Dame Chance" - 5:16
 "Moon Revolution" - 18:55
 "The Dreamhouse" - 5:02
 "Envoyé!" - 2:21
 "Speed of Night" - 5:49
 "L'Amourir" - 5:44
 "Fais La Mouette" - 4:50
 "Donnez Les Esprits" - 6:36

Personnel
 Glenn McGaha Miller - Mastering
 Alain Monod - Keyboards, Producer, Mixing
 Roli Mosimann - Arranging
 Bertrand Siffert - Mixing
 Franz Treichler - Vocals
 Bernard Trontin - Drums

The Young Gods albums
2001 live albums